Brett Michael Fraser (born August 28, 1989) is a competition swimmer and Pan American Games gold medalist from the Cayman Islands.  At the 2008 Summer Olympics, Fraser and his older brother, Shaune Fraser, were two of the three flag-bearers for the Cayman Islands.  He competed in the 200 m backstroke.

At the 2012 Summer Olympics, he was flagbearer for the Cayman Islands at the opening ceremony.  He competed in the 50 m, 100 m and 200 m freestyle events. He was a semi-finalist in the 100m and 200m freestyle, placing 14th and 12th overall, respectively.

At the 2014 Commonwealth Games, he competed in the 50 m butterfly and the 50 m freestyle.

Like his older brother, Fraser accepted an athletic scholarship to attend the University of Florida in Gainesville, Florida, United States, where he swam for coach Gregg Troy's Florida Gators swimming and diving team in National Collegiate Athletic Association (NCAA) and Southeastern Conference (SEC) competition from 2008 to 2011.

At the 2011 Pan American Games in Guadalajara, Mexico, Fraser won the gold medal in the men's 200-meter freestyle with a time of 1:47.18.

See also 

 Florida Gators
 List of University of Florida Olympians

References 

1989 births
Living people
Florida Gators men's swimmers
Caymanian male freestyle swimmers
Olympic swimmers of the Cayman Islands
Swimmers at the 2008 Summer Olympics
Swimmers at the 2012 Summer Olympics
Swimmers at the 2011 Pan American Games
Swimmers at the 2015 Pan American Games
Swimmers at the 2014 Commonwealth Games
Commonwealth Games competitors for the Cayman Islands
Pan American Games gold medalists for the Cayman Islands
Pan American Games medalists in swimming
Central American and Caribbean Games silver medalists for the Cayman Islands
Competitors at the 2010 Central American and Caribbean Games
Swimmers at the 2019 Pan American Games
Central American and Caribbean Games medalists in swimming
Medalists at the 2011 Pan American Games
Male butterfly swimmers
Male backstroke swimmers
Swimmers at the 2020 Summer Olympics